Soulmate is a Zimbabwean young adult drama series that premiered on ZTN Prime on May 29, 2022. It is produced by Heart FX Studios, a production house owned by award-winning Zimbabwean film maker Braydan Heart. Soulmate runs at 13 episodes per season and airs every Sunday at 21h00 CAT on ZTN Prime a new Zimbabwean TV channel that is on the South African satellite broadcaster DStv.

Plot 

 Soulmate explores concepts and themes associated with young adults but mainly focuses on the lives of Phumza a player from the ghetto side of town, who ends up in love with Lucratia, a rich good girl. As the show progresses, their lives intertwine in a clash of lifestyles, resentments, envy, and sexual attraction. The show takes place during the last days of the1st Zimbabwean COVID-19 lockdown.
 Structurally, the series employs a flash forward plot that involves a mystery element, with most episodes taking place in three time lines.

Main characters

References 

2022 television series debuts
Television shows about the COVID-19 pandemic
Zimbabwean television shows